Laura González Ospina (born 22 February 1995), also known as Laura Barjum, is a Colombian actress, model and beauty pageant titleholder.  She was Miss Colombia 2017 and later represented her country at the Miss Universe 2017 pageant, where she finished 1st Runner-Up.

Personal life
González was born in Cali but  moved to Cartagena when she was six months old. She attended high school in Cartagena Modern Gymnasium and Dramatic Art at the School of Education Actoral House Ensemble. She speaks Spanish, English and French.

Pageantry
On 20 March 2017, González was crowned Miss Colombia 2017.  She then represented Colombia at Miss Universe 2017, where she finished as the 1st Runner-up.  This marked the fourth year in a row that the delegate from Colombia placed in the pageant's Top 3.

Filmography 
González participated in the telenovela La Cacica playing Chechi and has also been featured in several films.

Television

References

External links

1995 births
Living people
Miss Universe 2017 contestants
Colombian people of Lebanese descent
Colombian female models
Colombian beauty pageant winners
Miss Colombia winners